Zoltan Fejer-Konnerth (born 20 July 1978) is a male former international table tennis player from Germany.

He won a silver medal at the 2004 World Team Table Tennis Championships in the Swaythling Cup (men's team event) with Timo Boll, Jörg Roßkopf, Torben Wosik and Christian Süß for Germany. He competed in men's doubles with Timo Boll at the 2004 Summer Olympics.

Two years later he won a bronze medal at the 2006 World Team Table Tennis Championships in the Swaythling Cup (men's team event) with Boll, Roßkopf, Bastian Steger and Süß for Germany.

He also won three European Table Tennis Championships medals in 2002 and 2003.

See also
 List of table tennis players
 List of World Table Tennis Championships medalists

References

External links
 
 

German male table tennis players
1978 births
Living people
Olympic table tennis players of Germany